The Law and the Lady is a 1924 American silent drama film directed by John L. McCutcheon and starring Alice Lake, Tyrone Power Sr. and Maurice Costello.

Plot summary

Cast
 Len Leo as Jack Langley
 Alice Lake as Marion Blake
 Mary Thurman as Minerva Blake
 Tyrone Power Sr. as John Langley Sr.
 Maurice Costello as Cyrus Blake
 Henry Sedley as Don Hollins
 Cornelius Keefe as Stephen Clark
 Joseph Depew as Office Boy
 Tom Blake as Bill Sims
 Joseph Burke as Butler
 Jack McLean as Hubert Townsend
 Rafaela Ottiano as Ma Sims

References

Bibliography
 Robert B. Connelly. The Silents: Silent Feature Films, 1910-36, Volume 40, Issue 2. December Press, 1998.

External links
 
 
 
 

1924 films
1924 drama films
1920s English-language films
American silent feature films
Silent American drama films
American black-and-white films
1920s American films